Günter Heßelmann (3 August 1925 – 12 September 2010) was a German middle-distance runner. He competed in the men's 3000 metres steeplechase at the 1952 Summer Olympics.

References

1925 births
2010 deaths
Athletes (track and field) at the 1952 Summer Olympics
German male middle-distance runners
German male steeplechase runners
Olympic athletes of Germany
Place of birth missing
20th-century German people